The 2014–15 Santa Clara Broncos men's basketball team represented Santa Clara University during the 2014–15 NCAA Division I men's basketball season. It was head coach Kerry Keating's eighth season at Santa Clara. The Broncos played their home games at the Leavey Center and were members of the West Coast Conference. They finished the season 14–18, 7–11 in WCC play to finish in a three way tie for sixth place. They advanced to the quarterfinals of the WCC tournament where they lost to BYU.

Previous season
The Broncos finished the season 14–19, 6–12 in WCC play to finish in a tie for eighth place. They advanced to the quarterfinals of the WCC tournament where they lost to Gonzaga.

Departures

Recruiting

Recruiting Class of 2015

Roster

Schedule and results

|-
!colspan=9 style="background:#F0E8C4; color:#AA003D;"| Exhibition

|-
!colspan=9 style="background:#AA003D; color:#F0E8C4;"| Regular season

|-
!colspan=9 style="background:#F0E8C4; color:#AA003D;"| WCC tournament

References

Santa Clara Broncos men's basketball seasons
Santa Clara